Pleasant Ridge is the name of the following places in the U.S. state of Indiana:
Pleasant Ridge, Jasper County, Indiana
Pleasant Ridge, Jay County, Indiana